Pagan Airstrip  is a public airport located on Pagan Island in the United States Commonwealth of the Northern Mariana Islands, near the village of Shomu-Shon. The airport is owned by Commonwealth Ports Authority.

Facilities and aircraft 
Pagan Airstrip has one runway (11/29) measuring 1,500 x 120 ft. (457 x 37 m), with a turf and gravel surface.

According to the most recent FAA data, for 12-month period ending September 26, 1980, the airport had 240 aircraft operations: 79% air taxi and 21% general aviation.

References

External links 

Airports in the Northern Mariana Islands